Bandgi is a 1972 Bollywood romance film directed by K. Shankar. The film stars Vinod Mehra & Sandhya Roy in lead roles.

Cast
 Vinod Mehra as Darpan
 Sandhya Roy as Aarti
 Pandari Bai as Sita
 Madan Puri as Jaswant
 Sujit Kumar as Kumar
 Padma Khanna as Lily
 Ramesh Deo as Shankarlal

Soundtrack
All songs were written by Rajendra Krishan.

External links
 

1972 films
1970s Hindi-language films
1970s romance films
Films scored by Shankar–Jaikishan
Films directed by K. Shankar
Indian romance films
Hindi-language romance films